Titania may refer to:

Astronomy
 Titania (moon), the largest moon of the planet Uranus
 593 Titania, an asteroid

Chemistry and mineralogy
 Titania, an alternate name for titanium dioxide

Fiction
 Titania (A Midsummer Night's Dream), the Queen of the Fairies in William Shakespeare's A Midsummer Night's Dream
 Titania (DC Comics), a DC Comics character
 Titania (Marvel Comics), a Marvel Comics supervillain
 Titania (Grapplers) or Lascivious, a Marvel Comics supervillain
 Titania (Fire Emblem), a paladin in Fire Emblem: Path of Radiance
 Titania (Dungeons & Dragons), a fey deity in Dungeons & Dragons
 Titania (Gargoyles), a character in Gargoyles
 Titania, a fictional computer in Starship Titanic
 Titania or Asuna, a character in Sword Art Online
 Titania, a fictional demon in Shin Megami Tensei
 Titania, a fictional kingdom in Odin Sphere
 Titania or Erza Scarlet, a character in Fairy Tail
 Titania, a fictional planet in the Star Fox Series
 Titania, a fictional character in The Ancient Magus' Bride
 Queen Titania, recurring character in the French Tara Duncan book series

Ships
 , a coaster in service 1939–1945
 , a Royal Navy submarine depot ship, 1915–1949
 , a U.S. Navy Arcturus-class attack cargo ship commissioned in 1942
 Fairey Titania, a class of sailing yacht built by Fairey Marine Ltd
 , a clipper operated by the Hudson's Bay Company from 1885–1893, see Hudson's Bay Company vessels

Other uses
 Titania (ballet), an 1866 ballet choreographed by Marius Petipa to music by Cesare Pugni
 Titania Peak, a rock peak on Alexander Island, Antarctica
 "Titania", a poem by Gustaf Fröding
 "Titania", a song by Mando Diao
 Titania AS, a titanium mining company with a mine in Sokndal, Norway

See also
 , a list of ships
 Titania's Palace, a miniature castle

 Tytania, Japanese sci-fi novel series written by Yoshiki Tanaka
 Tatiana